Lise Magnier (born 31 December 1984) is a French politician who has represented Marne's 4th constituency in the National Assembly of France since 2017.

Political career 
Magnier was elected in Marne's 4th constituency as a Republican at the 2017 legislative election.

In November 2017, Magnier joined the new Agir party. In 2022, she joined Horizons, and was re-elected in the 2022 French legislative election with the support from Ensemble Citoyens.

References

External links 
 Official page at the website of the French Parliament

1984 births
Living people
Politicians from Grand Est
People from Châlons-en-Champagne
Deputies of the 15th National Assembly of the French Fifth Republic
The Republicans (France) politicians
Agir (France) politicians
21st-century French women politicians
Women members of the National Assembly (France)
University of Lille Nord de France alumni
Deputies of the 16th National Assembly of the French Fifth Republic

Horizons politicians
Members of Parliament for Marne